Midge Gillies (fl. c. 2000) is a British journalist, biographer and creative writing tutor.

She was educated at Girton College, Cambridge. She has written extensively for newspapers including The Guardian and the Los Angeles Times. She is the author of seven books, including biographies of the British music hall star Marie Lloyd and the pioneer woman aviator Amy Johnson. Nicholas Lezard reviewed The Barbed-Wire University in The Guardian, calling it "a moving and eye-opening account of the lives of  PoWs by the daughter of a man who was captured."

Gillies is married and lives in Ely.

Major works

The Wedding Book. Bloomsbury, 1997. 
Business Writing. Marshall Publishing, 1999. 
Marie Lloyd: The One and Only. Gollancz, 1999. 
Amy Johnson: Queen of the Air. Weidenfeld & Nicolson, 2003. 
Waiting For Hitler: Voices From Britain on the Brink of Invasion. Hodder & Stoughton, 2006. 
How to write Memoir & Biographies. Guardian News & Media, 2008
Writing Lives: Literary Biography. Cambridge University Press, 2009. 
The Barbed-Wire University: The Real Lives of Allied Prisoners of War in the Second World War. Aurum, 2011

References

British biographers
British journalists
Alumni of Girton College, Cambridge
Living people
Year of birth missing (living people)